Norberto may refer to:

Norberto Alonso (born 1953), former Argentine football midfielder
Norberto Araujo (born 1978), Argentine football central defender
Norberto Aroldi (1932–1978), Argentine film actor and screenwriter
Norberto Barba (born 1963), American cinematographer and film director
Norberto Bobbio (1909–2004), Italian philosopher of law and political sciences and a historian of political thought
Norberto Bocchi (born 1961), Italian bridge player
Norberto Bravo (born 1970), professional boxer
Norberto Ceresole (1943–2003), Argentine sociologist and political scientist
Norberto Collado Abreu (1921–2008), the Cuban captain of the yacht which ferried Fidel Castro and 81 supporters to Cuba from Mexico in 1956
Norberto Costa Alegre (born 1951), former prime minister of São Tomé and Príncipe
Norberto Doroteo Méndez (1923–1998), former Argentine football striker
Norberto Esbrez (born 1966), Argentinian tango dancer, choreographer, and teacher
Norberto Fontana (born 1975), Argentine racing driver
Norberto Fuentes (born 1943), writer and journalist
Norberto Garrido (born 1972), former American football offensive lineman
Norberto González (born 1979), left-handed pitcher for the Cuban national baseball team
Norberto Höfling (1924–2005), Romanian footballer and coach
Norberto Huezo (born 1956), former soccer player from El Salvador
Norberto Doroteo Méndez (1923–1998), former Argentine football striker
Norberto Martin (born 1966), former Major League Baseball second baseman
Norberto Massoni (born 1935), Argentine Radical Civic Union politician
Norberto Mulenessa Maurito (born 1981), Angolan football forward
Norberto Oberburger (born 1960), Italian weightlifter
Norberto Odebrecht (born 1920), founded the Odebrecht Foundation in 1965
Norberto Paparatto (born 1984), Argentine footballer
Norberto Peluffo (born 1958), former Colombian football player and manager
Norberto Piñero (1858–1938), Argentine lawyer, writer and conservative politician
Norberto Raffo (1939–2008), Argentine football striker
Norberto Ramírez (died 1856), Nicaraguan lawyer and politician
Norberto Rivera Carrera (born 1942), Mexican Cardinal of the Roman Catholic Church
Norberto Romuáldez (1875–1941), Philippine writer, politician, jurist and statesman
Norberto Scoponi, former Argentine football goalkeeper
Norberto Téllez (born 1972), retired Cuban runner
Norberto Yácono (1919–1985), Argentine football defender

Buildings
Convento de San Norberto (Madrid)
Nolberto

Spanish masculine given names